MovieMaker is a magazine, website and podcast network focused on the art and business of filmmaking with a special emphasis on independent film. The magazine is published on a quarterly basis.

See also
 List of film periodicals

References

External links
 

1993 establishments in Washington (state)
Bimonthly magazines published in the United States
English-language magazines
Film magazines published in the United States
Magazines established in 1993
Magazines published in Los Angeles
Magazines published in Seattle